Antonio Molinari (1626 – 11 July 1698) was a Roman Catholic prelate who served as Bishop of Lettere-Gragnano (1676–1698).

Biography
Antonio Molinari was born in Genoa, Italy in 1626 and ordained a priest on 8 April 1651.
On 2 December 1676, he was appointed during the papacy of Pope Innocent XII as Bishop of Lettere-Gragnano.
On 6 December 1676, he was consecrated bishop by Giacomo Franzoni, Bishop of Camerino, with Francesco de' Marini, Titular Archbishop of Teodosia, and Domenico Gianuzzi, Titular Bishop of Dioclea in Phrygia, serving as co-consecrators. 
He served as Bishop of Lettere-Gragnano until his death on 11 July 1698.

References

External links and additional sources
 (for Chronology of Bishops) 
 (for Chronology of Bishops)  

17th-century Italian Roman Catholic bishops
Bishops appointed by Pope Innocent XII
1626 births
1698 deaths